Jean-Claude Lecante (born 12 November 1934) is a French former cyclist. He competed at the 1956 Summer Olympics, winning a silver medal in the team pursuit event.

References

External links
 

1934 births
Living people
French male cyclists
Olympic cyclists of France
Cyclists at the 1956 Summer Olympics
People from Saint-Ouen-sur-Seine
Cyclists from Île-de-France
Olympic silver medalists for France
Olympic medalists in cycling
Medalists at the 1956 Summer Olympics
French track cyclists
Sportspeople from Seine-Saint-Denis